Rural Hall Depot is a historic train station located at Rural Hall, Forsyth County, North Carolina.  It was built in 1888 for the Cape Fear and Yadkin Valley Railway.  It is a one-story rectangular frame building sheathed in German siding.  It measures 23 feet wide and 78 feet long.  The interior consists of waiting rooms for white and "colored" passengers and a station master's office.  Passenger service ceased in 1955, but the depot continued to provide services and facilities to freight trains until its closing in 1980. The building was moved to its present site in March 1980, and serves as a local railroad museum.

It was listed on the National Register of Historic Places in 1983.

References

External links
 Rural Hall Historic Train Depot - Facebook site

Railway stations on the National Register of Historic Places in North Carolina
Railway stations in the United States opened in 1888
Museums in Forsyth County, North Carolina
National Register of Historic Places in Forsyth County, North Carolina
Railroad museums in North Carolina
Former railway stations in North Carolina